The FIBA Under-21 World Championship was a men's under-21-only basketball competition organized by the International Basketball Federation (FIBA). It was known as the FIBA 22 & Under World Championship before FIBA lowered the age limit to 21 years in December 1998, and had its name changed to World Championship for Young Men. The competition adopted its final name in 2004. FIBA later discontinued the world championship for this age group.

Summaries

Medal table

Participation details

References

External links
 United States history via Archive.org
 FIBA Archive

 
Under
Under-21 basketball competitions between national teams
World youth sports competitions
World championships in basketball